Cowessess 73 is an Indian reserve of the Cowessess First Nation in Saskatchewan. It is 13 kilometres northwest of Broadview. In the 2016 Canadian Census, it recorded a population of 540 living in 190 of its 214 total private dwellings. In the same year, its Community Well-Being index was calculated at 63 of 100, compared to 58.4 for the average First Nations community and 77.5 for the average non-Indigenous community.

In June 2021, anomalies in the earth suspected of containing the remains of 751 children were found at the former Marieval Indian residential school in Marieval, part of the Canadian Indian residential school system, the most found in Canada to date.

References

Indian reserves in Saskatchewan
Division No. 5, Saskatchewan
Cowessess First Nation